Jennifer Sichel (born March 9, 1988 in Clifton, New Jersey) is an American coxswain. She competed at the 2016 Summer Paralympics in Rio de Janeiro. She won three silver medals from the World Rowing Championships and a silver medal from the 2016 Paralympic Games. She is a Royal Canadian Henley Regatta champion, a five-time Head of the Charles Regatta champion, and three-time U.S. national champion. She was a member of the Paralympic Great Eight at the 2016 Head of the Charles Regatta consisting of gold, silver, and bronze Rio Paralympic medalists from Great Britain, United States, and Canada.

Career

Senior career

2013–2014 season
Sichel won a silver medal in the Legs, Trunk, & Arms Mixed 4+ at the 2014 World Rowing Championships in Amsterdam, Netherlands.

2014–2015 season
Sichel won a silver medal in the Legs, Trunk, & Arms Mixed 4+ at the 2015 World Rowing Championships in Aiguebelette, France.

2015–2016 season
Sichel won a silver medal in the Legs, Trunk, & Arms Mixed 4+ at the 2016 Paralympic Games in Rio de Janeiro, Brazil.

2016–2017 season
Sichel won a silver medal in the PR3 Mixed 4+ at the 2017 World Rowing Championships in Sarasota, Florida.

Competitive History

Senior

References

External links
 Jennifer Sichel at US Rowing

Living people
Paralympic rowers of the United States
Rowers at the 2016 Summer Paralympics
World Rowing Championships medalists for the United States
American female rowers
Coxswains (rowing)
1988 births
Medalists at the 2016 Summer Paralympics
Paralympic medalists in rowing
Paralympic silver medalists for the United States
21st-century American women